The 1993 Camden Town bombing occurred on 27 February 1993, when a bomb exploded in Camden High Street, injuring 18 people. The Provisional IRA was responsible, planting the explosive in a litter bin and targeting people on the busiest day of the week, Saturday, after midday. One of the injured was Swedish tourist Jenny Erikson, 22. The IRA gave a coded telephone warning that a bomb was planted at a Kentucky Fried Chicken fast food store in the north end of High Street, near Camden Lock Market. Police unknowingly moved people towards the bomb's path in the south end 400 yards away. Scotland Yard chief Bernard Luckhurst said the misleading warnings of the bomb were "clearly designed" to kill or injure as many as it could.

Earlier the IRA sent a warning about a bomb in Oxford Street, which also had to be evacuated by police. The attack occurred a day after the Warrington bomb attacks.

See also
Chronology of Provisional Irish Republican Army actions (1992–1999)
1993 Harrods bombing

References

1993 crimes in the United Kingdom
1993 in London
Explosions in 1993
Provisional IRA bombings in London
Terrorist incidents in the United Kingdom in 1993
February 1993 events in the United Kingdom
Crime in the London Borough of Camden
20th century in the London Borough of Camden